The Mosgiel Woollen Mill is situated in Mosgiel, Dunedin, New Zealand, and was opened in 1871.

The Mosgiel Woollen Mill was the second woollen mill to open in New Zealand. The mill was integral to the town and a significant employer from when it opened until the end of the 20th century when it closed.

Frank W. Boreham described the mill in his 1916 book Faces in the Fire:

Notable people 
Elizabeth Turnbull (1885–1988) – head of her section in the hosier department of the mill

References

External links

Heritage New Zealand Category 1 historic places in Otago
Buildings and structures completed in 1871
1870s architecture in New Zealand
Woollen mills